Kes 79 (G33.6+0.1) is a supernova remnant.
It is located in the constellation Aquila, preceding LDN617 (Lynds Dark Nebula 617).

References

See also
 List of supernova remnants

Supernova remnants